Hiriyur Manjunath Jyothi (born 1 July 1983) is an Indian sprinter and Commonwealth games medalist. She competes in the 100 metres, 200 metres, and 4×100 metres relay categories. She is a national champion or former national champion in each of the three events, with personal best timings of 11.3 (or 11.46), 23.42, and 43.42 seconds in the 100 metres, 200 metres, and  4×100 metres relay, respectively. Her personal best times in all three events were after her withdrawal from professional competition for three years to become a mother. A Canara Bank employee, Jyothi is married to the former sprinter S. Srinivas, who is also her personal coach. Despite wanting to win a medal at Asian games, she couldn’t continue sprint due to persistent achilles injury. She ended up her career in 2017 with a gold at the open nationals, Chennai.

Early life 
Jyothi was born to father H. N. Manjunath and mother Thippamma in Hiriyur, Karnataka (near Chitradurga), on 1 July 1983. She has four brothers and sisters, and is the family's second daughter.

Career highlights
 Bronze in the 100 metres at the 2009 Asian Athletics Championships in Guangzhou, China, with a time of 11.60 seconds, India's first sub-400 metres sprint medal in nine years in the Asian Athletics Championships
 Bronze in the 4×100 metres relay at the 2010 Commonwealth Games in New Delhi with a time of 45.25 seconds, running the anchor leg
 Broke the national record in the 4×100 metres relay in May 2016 with a time of 44.03 seconds at the IAAF World Challenge Beijing, with Merlin Joseph, Srabani Nanda, and Dutee Chand
 Broke their own national record in the 4×100 metres relay the following month with a time of 43.42 seconds at Almaty, Kazakhstan, again with Merlin Joseph, Srabani Nanda, and Dutee Chand
 Bronze in the 200 metres with a time of 23.92 seconds at the 2016 Taiwan Open Athletics Championships
 Bronze in the 100 metres with a time of 11.97 seconds at the 2006 Inter-State Championship
 Gold in the 100 metres with a time of 11.87 seconds at the 2015 Inter-State Championship
 Best Athlete Award at the 2016 National Open Championship on winning gold in all three of her events (100 metres in 11.57 seconds, 200 metres in 23.73 seconds, and 4×100 metres relay in 46.52 seconds)
 Overall champion at the 2017 Karnataka State Senior Athletics Championship, with silver in the 200 metres with a time of 24.5 seconds    
She has won around forty medals from nationals and the internationals.

Awards
 Karnataka Olympics Association Award in Athletics in 2016
 Ekalavya Award in Athletics for 2010 from the government of Karnataka
 Rajothsava Award for Sports for 2010 from the government of Karnataka

Sponsorship 

Jyothi has been strongly supported by her parents, who have undergone great financial hardship to finance her ambitions. She has also received sponsorship from her employer, Canara Bank, since 2004, and also receives sponsorship from the Indian Athletics Academy, Bangalore.

Personal life 

Jyothi married former sprinter S. Srinivas, who is also her personal coach. In 2011, she withdrew from professional competition and gave birth to a baby girl, dhruthi hassini. Jyothi returned to sprinting at the 2014 Senior Inter-State Meet, and also participated at the 2014 Commonwealth Games and 2014 Asian Games. She credited her husband with helping her, saying in 2014 that "Being a former medalist at the Asian level he understands my problems. It was because of his help that I'm able to manage my training and taking care of my two-and-half-year old daughter." Post

retireme,nthe t couple also been blessed with a b. t,

References 

Indian female sprinters
Athletes (track and field) at the 2006 Asian Games
Athletes (track and field) at the 2010 Asian Games
Athletes (track and field) at the 2014 Asian Games
Athletes (track and field) at the 2010 Commonwealth Games
1983 births
Living people
Commonwealth Games medallists in athletics
Commonwealth Games bronze medallists for India
Asian Games competitors for India
Medallists at the 2010 Commonwealth Games